Rai Bahadur Mohan Singh Oberoi (15 August 1898 – 3 May 2002) was an Indian hotelier, the founder and chairman of Oberoi Hotels & Resorts, India's second-largest hotel company, with 31 hotels in India, Egypt, Indonesia, UAE, Mauritius and Saudi Arabia.

In his obituary the Times of India said that he was acknowledged for putting the Indian hotel industry on the global map by successfully establishing hotel brands like Oberoi and Trident worldwide.

Early years

Oberoi was born in a Khatri family in Bhaun, a minor village of Jhelum District (now Chakwal District), Punjab, British India. When he was six months old, his father, a contractor in Peshawar, died, leaving his mother with few resources. After attending schools in his village and nearby Rawalpindi, he passed the Intermediate College Examination in Lahore, but was unable to continue attending classes because of lack of finances. Instead, he learned typing and shorthand.

Career

1918-1934: Early works and struggle 
In 1922, Oberoi got a job at The Cecil Hotel in Shimla. to escape from the epidemic of plague and as front desk clerk, at a salary of Rs 50 per month. He was a quick learner and took many additional responsibilities. The manager of Cecil, Mr. Ernest Clarke and his wife Gertrude took a great liking to the honesty of a hardworking young Mohan Singh Oberoi.

Mr. Clarke and his wife decided to hand over the responsibility of managing Hotel Carlton now renamed as Clarkes to this impressive young man. It was here, at Clarkes Hotel, that Mohan Singh gained firsthand experience in all aspects of operating a hotel. During their six months absence, Mr. Mohan Singh Oberoi doubled up the occupancy to eighty percent which gave them enough reason to offer the hotel – on a decided amount to Mr. Mohan Singh Oberoi as they wanted to return to England.

1934-1962: Business 
As India became independent, Oberoi built additional hotels, while expanding his base holdings. In 1948, he established East India Hotels, now known as EIH Ltd., whose first acquisition was the Oberoi Grand Hotel in Calcutta. In April 1955 he was elected President of the Federation of Hotel and Restaurant Associations of India, and in 1960 was named President of Honour of the Federation for life.

In 1965, in partnership with international hotel chains, he opened the Oberoi Intercontinental in Delhi.

1962-Politics

He participated in legislative politics by winning elections to the Rajya Sabha for two terms, from April 1962 to March 1968 and from April 1972 to April 1978. He was elected to the fourth Lok Sabha in April 1968 as candidate of Indian National Congress from Hazaribagh Parliamentary Constituency, and remained a Member of that House till December 1972.

Oberoi Group 
The Oberoi Group, founded in 1934, employed about 12,000 people worldwide and owned and managed about thirty hotels and five luxury cruisers . Oberoi Amarvilas, Agra, ranks amongst the top ten hotel spas Asia-Pacific, Africa, and the Middle East of the Travel + Leisure magazine, and ranked third in Best Hotels in Asia in 2007. Other activities include airline catering, management of restaurants and airport bars, travel and tour services, car rental, project management and corporate air charters. The Group has a number of hotels worldwide, latest hotel additions being in Singapore, Saudi Arabia, Sri Lanka, Nepal, Egypt and Africa.

Oberoi was the first to employ women in the hospitality sector. In 1966, he also established The Oberoi Centre for Learning and Development, which is now regarded as one of Asia's top institutions for hospitality education.

Honours and awards
Throughout his later life Oberoi received numerous honours and awards from the Indian government and private organizations.

Oberoi was presented with the title Rai Bahadur (pater familiae) by His Majesty The King of Great Britain in 1943.

He was awarded the Padma Bhushan, one of India's highest civilian awards, in 2001.

Centenarian
Almost all publications indicated Oberoi's year of birth as 1898 and his age at death as 103. In his own autobiographical sketch – How M S Oberoi became India's greatest hotelier, however, he gave 1900 as his official birth year, a fact attesting to his having lived to 101. However, The New York Times obituary, the date is given as 1898 and the following was written: "He was 103, although for years he said he was born in 1900 because he did not want to be seen as dating from the 19th century."

Personal life and family
Oberoi married Ishran Devi in 1920, the daughter of Shri Ushnak Rai belonged to his village. They had two sons and two daughters. Eldest son Raj Tilak Singh Oberoi (1924) known as Tikki Oberoi and second son Prithvi Raj Singh Oberoi (1929) better known to the world as Bikki Oberoi.

Tikki Oberoi married Leela Naidu on 16 July 1956; he was 33, she 17. Her father was a nuclear physicist, Science Director for UNESCO for South East Asia. They had twin daughters, Priya Oberoi and Maya Oberoi. Bikki Oberoi married Goodie in 1959, the daughter of a Punjabi landowner of Lyalpur. They had a son Vikram Oberoi and two daughters. Oberoi's daughter Swaraj married Gautam Khanna in 1950. Youngest daughter Prem married Captain KK Mehra in 1957. Tikki married in 1964 Jutta, the Teuton daughter of Ludwig Mittel Huber. They had a son Arjun Singh Oberoi.

Oberoi's nephew Brij Raj Oberoi also called as "Diamond Oberoi" (nickname given by Oberoi) consciously followed his uncle's footsteps and continued in the family business, by operating several Heritage hotels in the Himalayas.

Further reading
 Dare to Dream: a Life of Rai Bahadur Mohan Singh Oberoi, by Bachi J Karkaria. Viking, 1992. .
 216: M.S. Oberoi. 333 Great Indians, who is who & who was Who, from the Remotest Past to the Nearest Present: Philosophers, Politicians, Diplomats. Edited by Om Parkash Varma. Published by Varma Bros., 1963. Page 189 Rai Bahadur Mohan Singh Oberoi: Father of the Indian Hotel Industry. by Chathoth, P. K. Chon, K. K. S. Journal of Hospitality and Tourism Education, 2006, Vol. 18, no. 1, pp. 7–10. USA. ISSN 1096-3758.

References

External links
 How M S Oberoi became India's greatest hotelier by M.S. Oberoi, with note by Dr. Gita Piramal, Managing Editor, The Smart Manager. Rediff.com
 M.S. Oberoi dies at 103 (2002) The Hindu Business Line.
 Rai Bahadur M S Oberoi – A Tribute To The Founding Father (2000) Indian Express.
 MS Oberoi:A Century Of Hospitality the-south-Asian, September 2000.

The Oberoi Group
Businesspeople from Punjab, India
Indian centenarians
Men centenarians
Punjabi people
1898 births
2002 deaths
India MPs 1967–1970
Rajya Sabha members from Uttar Pradesh
Recipients of the Padma Bhushan in trade and industry
Indian hoteliers
Rai Bahadurs